Up There, Down Here is the fifth full length studio album released by American band The Badlees. It was due to be second released nationally on the Polydor label, but got caught up in constant delays due to the corporate merger of Polygram and Seagram, that formed the new Universal Music Group in 1998. The album was finally released in August, 1999 on the Ark 21 label, after the Badlees were dropped by Universal.

Background
The Badlees recorded their follow-up to the blockbuster River Songs in 1997 and it was originally slated to be released for the Christmas season of that year. But after a few delays by Polydor and then the sale to Seagram's put all projects on hold indefinitely in 1998, the project and the band. Over the final months of 1998 and into 1999, requested, then demanded, then begged the label to either release Up There, Down Here to the public, or release the Badlees from their contract, but got little to no response.

Frustrated, The Badlees went and recorded a whole new album, Amazing Grace, independently, a move that could not possibly be ignored by the folks at the new Universal Music Group, and was bound to cause some movement one way or another. The band members realized that this action would probably mean the death of Up There, Down Here, as Universal owned the rights to that recording. The strategy apparently worked, as The Badlees were dropped from the label on the very day that Amazing Grace was released.

Manager Terry Selders had brought in attorney and agent Larry Mazer to try to get the band picked up by another major label but he was having little success on this front. So Terry contacted John Rotella, who had worked at Polydor when the Badlees were signed and was himself a casualty of the Seagram's sale. Rotella was now at a label called Ark 21, owned by Miles Copeland III, who had previously been phenomenally successful with I.R.S. Records. Through the joint efforts of Selders, Mazer, and Rotella, Ark 21 was able to gain the rights for Up There, Down Here from Universal and by May 1999 a deal was in place. The album was finally be released to the public in August 1999.

The opening song, "Don’t Let Me Hide" is undoubtedly the best song on the album, with a profound lyric, subtle, moody guitars and excellent high harmonies that complement the strong lead vocals.

Up There, Down Here is notable for bringing to the surface some elements of the band's talent that had frequently blended into the fabric of their fine songs of the past. Jeff Feltenberger shines on this album like never before. He wrote the moody masterpiece "34 Winters", which includes some fantastic vocal trade-offs between himself and Pete Palladino, a quality that is also present in the beautifully atmospheric "Thinking In Ways", another profound gem. Ron Simasek's precision, yet intricate, drumming skills can really be appreciated throughout the album like never before, well spotlighted due to its high-end production.

Most of the afore-mentioned gems reside near the top of the album. Towards the middle of the album, there are several songs that show flashes of brilliance or potential but don't seem to quite get there. But Up There, Down Here finishes strong, as the final three songs on the album are all interesting. "Silly Little Man" may forecast some of new, experimental sounds that Alexander and the band would explore in the coming decade. This song has a rhythm in the same vein as "Sweet Home Alabama" while simultaneously possessing a very Beatle-esque vibe with references to "the beautiful people" in the hook and a chaotic, "A Day in the Life"-like conclusion. The next song, "The Second Coming of Chris" is a mechanical, quirky show tune that has some masterful plays on words and untamed electric guitars. The closer, "A Little Faith", is a short (san the "hidden track within it") Americana-fused ballad sung by Bret Alexander.

With the album that the band had prepared for and worked on for nearly four years finally released on August 24, 1999, the Badlees were ready to go on the road nationally in support of the album, as they had for River Songs. But there was yet more disappointment to come. It turned out that their new label, Ark 21 was well on its way to bankruptcy, and they seemed neither willing nor able to provide the band the support they needed to promote this album via touring, merchandising, or licensing. In fact, Terry Selders got so frustrated with this lack of support that he flew to the record company offices and manned the phones personally, trying to land licensing deals for songs from Up There, Down Here. He did have a measure of success, by getting a song onto the new Warner Brothers TV show Odd Man Out, and with the inclusion of "Don’t Let Me Hide" in the film Boys and Girls''. But these were quite small victories for the band that had been true victims of misfortune, not of their own doing, over the past 18 months or so.

The Badlees left Ark 21 after a very short period and returned to their status as an independent band, a state where they had been nothing but productive, growing, and artistically successful in the past.

Track listing

PersonnelThe Badlees Pete Palladino – Vocals, Harmonica
 Bret Alexander – Guitars, Mandolin, Dobro, Dulcimer, Banjo, Vocals
 Jeff Feltenberger – Guitars, Vocals
 Paul Smith – Bass, Keyboards, Vocals
 Ron Simasek – Drums, PercussionAdditional Musicians Robert Scott Richardson - Hammond B-3, PianoProduction'''
 Joe Alexander - Producer
 Bret Alexander, Paul Smith - Engineers
 Pete Palladino - Layout & Design
 Terry Selders - Manager
 Scott Berger - Tour Manager
 Keith Barshinger - House Engineer

References
Modern Rock Review Badlees Profile, October 10, 2010
The Badlees Archives by Alan K. Stout

1999 albums
The Badlees albums